Mitakshara Kumar is an Indian filmmaker and writer. Mitakshara graduated in Economics(Hons) from Lady Shri Ram College for Women. After completing her graduation, she went on to pursue direction from Film and Television Institute of India Pune in 2004. She started her career as an assistant director for post on the 2005 Hindi film, Bluffmaster!, directed by Rohan Sippy. She went on to work as an assistant director in films like Bas Ek Pal, Dil Kabaddi. She produced an international feature-length American documentary, The origin Of Sound. 

After working on films like Youngistaan and Shab Mitakshara went on to work as an associate director with Sanjay Leela Bhansali on his magnum opuses Bajirao Mastani and Padmaavat Mitakshara was working with Mr. Bhansali on Gangubai Kathiawadi when she was approached by Nikkhil Advani to direct the web series The Empire (TV series) for Disney+Hostar.

Mitakshara is married to Anurag Sinha (actor) (Bollywood actor) since November 2009.

Films and series 
The Empire 2021

Padmaavat 2018

Bajirao Mastani 2015

Youngistaan 2014

Amar Must Die 2014

Rajjo 2013

The origin Of Sound

I AM 2010

Dil Kabaddi 2008

Mummy Punjabi2007

Bas Ek Pal 2006

Bluffmaster! 2005

References

<https://www.indiatoday.in/amp/binge-watch/story/the-empire-director-mitakshara-kumar-will-take-comparisons-with-game-of-thrones-as-a-compliment-1841948-2021-08-17>

<https://www.dailypioneer.com/2021/entertainment/lucky-to-have--the-empire--as-my-directorial-debut--mitakshara.html>

<https://www.jagran.com/lite/entertainment/web-series-review-the-empire-web-series-director-mitakshara-kumar-on-shooting-of-the-historical-fiction-show-staring-kunal-kapoor-21925280.html>

<https://www.gadgets.ndtv.com/entertainment/features/the-empire-hotstar-series-india-biggest-shabana-azmi-dino-morea-kunal-kapoor-drashti-dhami-2512470%3famp=1&akamai-rum=off>

<https://www.imdb.com/name/nm3128535/?ref_=fn_al_nm_1>

<http://www.deccanherald.com/content/32203/anurag-sinha-marry-girlfriend-nov.html>

<https://web.archive.org/web/20090706210636/http://lite.epaper.timesofindia.com/mobile.aspx?article=yes>

<>

1984 births
Living people
Indian women filmmakers
Indian filmmakers
Lady Shri Ram College alumni
People from Meerut